Ian McKay (1953–1982) was a British soldier who won a posthumous Victoria Cross in the Falklands War.

Ian McKay may also refer to:
Ian McKay (footballer) (1923–2010), Australian rules footballer with North Adelaide
Ian McKay (writer) (born 1962), English art critic, writer, and academic
Ian McKay (historian) (born 1953), Canadian historian
Ian McKay (judge) (1929–2014), New Zealand judge
Ian G. McKay (born 1963), Canadian director of the Liberal Party of Canada

See also
Iain MacKay (politician), Canadian-Yukon politician and leader of the Yukon Liberal Party
Ian MacKaye (born 1962), American rock musician
Ian Mackay (disambiguation)
Iain Mackay, British field hockey player